Alfredo Rogerio Pérez Bravo is the Ambassador Extraordinary and Plenipotentiary of the United Mexican States to the Russian Federation.

References 

Year of birth missing (living people)
Living people
Ambassadors of Mexico to Russia
Ambassadors of Mexico to Algeria
Ambassadors of Mexico to Panama
Ambassadors of Mexico to Malaysia